Miroslav Javín (born 2 August 1968) is a Slovak professional ice hockey player who played with HC Slovan Bratislava in the Slovak Extraliga.

References

Living people
HC Košice players
HC Slovan Bratislava players
1968 births
Slovak ice hockey defencemen
Sportspeople from Karviná
Czechoslovak ice hockey defencemen
Slovak expatriate ice hockey players in the Czech Republic
Slovak expatriate sportspeople in Poland
Expatriate ice hockey players in Poland